is a railway station in the city of Shimada, Shizuoka Prefecture, Japan,  operated by the Ōigawa Railway.

Lines
Kamio Station is on the Ōigawa Main Line and is 9.8 from the terminus of the line at Kanaya Station.

Station layout
The station has a single island platform with a wooden passenger shelter. There is no station building, and the station is unattended.

Adjacent stations

|-
!colspan=5|Ōigawa Railway

.

Station history
Kamio Station was one of the original stations of the Ōigawa Main Line and was  opened on July 20, 1928.

Passenger statistics
In fiscal 2017, the station was used by an average of 2 passengers daily (boarding passengers only).

Surrounding area
The station is located in an isolated rural area near the Oi River

See also
 List of Railway Stations in Japan

References

External links

 Ōigawa Railway home page

Stations of Ōigawa Railway
Railway stations in Shizuoka Prefecture
Railway stations in Japan opened in 1928
Shimada, Shizuoka